Sadun Boro (1928 – 5 June 2015) was the first Turkish amateur sailor to circumnavigate the globe by sailing.

Early years
Sadun Boro was born in Istanbul, Turkey in 1928. He spent his childhood at Caddebostan neighborhood of Kadıköy, Istanbul, on the coast of Sea of Marmara. He changed his rowing boat with a sailboat as soon as he became a high school student.

He finished Galatasaray High School in 1948, and went to the United Kingdom to study textile engineering at University of Manchester Institute of Science and Technology.

In 1952, Boro made his first ocean voyage from British Islands to the Caribbean Islands on the -long sailboat Ling together with an Englishman. The story of his travel that lasted six months was published in serial format in the Turkish daily Cumhuriyet, and was compiled in his book titled Bir Hayalin Peşinde (literally: In Pursuit of a Dream) later in 2004.

Circumnavigation the globe

His -long sloop was laid down at the workshop of Athar Beşpınar in Salacak neighborhood of Üsküdar, Istanbul in 1963, and named Kısmet (Turkish for "Fortune"). The sail, he manufactured in the textile plant, he was working at Çukurova, southern Turkey.

Boro began his westabout (east to west) voyage to circumnavigate the globe on 22 August 1965, accompanied by his German-born wife Oda Boro. He set sail from Istanbul, passed Strait of Gibraltar crossing Mediterranean Sea and reached Canary Islands, where they took a housecat aboard and named it "Miço" (Turkish for "shipmate"). Crossing the Atlantic Ocean, he arrived in Barbados and Caribbean Islands. Passing through the Panama Canal, he sailed crossing Pacific Ocean to Galápagos Islands, Marquesas Islands, Tuamotu Archipelago, Tahiti, Society Islands, Tonga Islands, Fiji Islands, New Hebrides and New Guinea. His route went then through Torres Strait to Timor, Indonesia and Singapore. Crossing the Bay of Bengal, he was in Ceylon (today: Sri Lanka). He sailed then on Arabian Sea and Red Sea and then was carried by a truck from Eilat to Haifa. In Mediterranean Sea again, his last stop before completing his globe circumnavigation was Israel.

On 15 June 1968, after 1,028 days of an ocean voyage, he arrived in Istanbul, where he was welcomed by his mother, and cheered as a national hero. Becoming the first ever Turkish global circumnavigator, he paved the way for global circumnavigation of Turkish sailors.

The memories about his voyage around the world were published as newspaper serialization in the daily Hürriyet at that time, and were written down later in his popular book Pupa Yelken (Turkish for "Full Sail").

Erected in front of the Kalamış Marina's main entrance in Kadıköy, Istanbul, a monument featuring Sadun Boro at boat's wheel of his sloop and his wife Oda standing next, both sailing on the globe commemorates his achievement.

Later years
Between 1977–79, Sadun Boro sailed with his wife and then-eight-year-old daughter Deniz to the Caribbean and the East Coast of the United States. After 1980, he settled down in Bodrum and Gökova, known for its idyllic coasts full of forests and turquoise sea.

He devoted himself to the protection of nature at the Turkish Riviera, in particular in Gökova, Göcek and Fethiye. Boro aimed to instil love for nature and sea to young people with his articles published in newspapers and journals. As a lover of Gökova, he had a mermaid statue erected with an inscription atop a rock in the middle of Okluk Bay. The inscription reads Boro's words as "This mermaid has traveled many seas and horizons to find the heaven that she dreamed of. She traveled continents, islands and bays, until she reached Gökova." His latest book, titled Vira Demir (Turkish for "Haul Up the Anchor"), is a guide for sailors.

Sadun Boro lived in Okluk Bay, Gökova on board his catamaran named Son Bahar (Turkish for "Autumn" or "Last Spring").

Illness and death
Sadun Boro was diagnosed with bladder cancer a couple of years ago. He was first treated in Marmaris, where he lived, and then transferred to the American Hospital in Istanbul. However, he was airlifted by helicopter back to Muğla on 14 May 2015 as he wished to spend his rest of life on board of his sailboat.

At 9:15 hours local time on 5 June 2015, he died at age 87 in the intensive care unit of a hospital at Marmaris, where he was taken into three days before. His last will was to be buried under the pine, to which his sailboat is secured mooring at İngilizlimanı (literally: English Harbor) in Gökova. For its realization, a cabinet decision is necessary. He was interred in Karacasöğüt Cemetery in Marmaris following a memorial tour in the bays of the Turkish Riviera he admired on board of his catamaran Son Bahar accompanied by many boats and vessels of the Turkish Coast Guard and a frigate of the Turkish Navy.

He was survived by his wife Oda and his daughter Deniz (Turkish for "Sea").

Works

Other Turkish circumnavigators of the globe
Turkish sailors circumnavigated the globe following Sadun Boro, listed chronologically:

References

External links

1928 births
Writers from Istanbul
Galatasaray High School alumni
Alumni of the University of Manchester Institute of Science and Technology
Engineers  from Istanbul
Textile engineers
Turkish sailors
Circumnavigators of the globe
21st-century travel writers
Turkish travel writers
2015 deaths
Deaths from cancer in Turkey
Deaths from bladder cancer